Clifton is a city in Clay and Washington counties in the U.S. state of Kansas.  As of the 2020 census, the population of the city was 454.

History
Clifton was founded in 1870, and bears the name of a surveyor who had platted the original town in 1859.

Clifton was an important shipping point located at the junction of three railroads.

Geography
Clifton is located at  (39.567063, -97.279982). The city is located next to Vining.

Demographics

2010 census
As of the census of 2010, there were 554 people, 232 households, and 145 families residing in the city. The racial makeup of the city was 98.6% White, 0.4% African American, 0.2% Native American, 0.5% from other races, and 0.4% from two or more races. Hispanic or Latino of any race were 1.1% of the population.

There were 232 households, of which 26.3% had children under the age of 18 living with them, 53.9% were married couples living together, 5.6% had a female householder with no husband present, 3.0% had a male householder with no wife present, and 37.5% were non-families. 34.5% of all households were made up of individuals, and 19.8% had someone living alone who was 65 years of age or older. The average household size was 2.30 and the average family size was 2.99.

The median age in the city was 46 years. 22.4% of residents were under the age of 18; 7.3% were between the ages of 18 and 24; 18.5% were from 25 to 44; 26.9% were from 45 to 64; and 25.1% were 65 years of age or older. The gender makeup of the city was 48.7% male and 51.3% female.

2000 census
As of the census of 2000, there were 557 people, 240 households, and 149 families residing in the city. The racial makeup of the city was 98.74% White, 0.54% Native American, and 0.72% from two or more races.

There were 240 households, out of which 28.8% had children under the age of 18 living with them, 52.1% were married couples living together, 6.7% had a female householder with no husband present, and 37.9% were non-families. 35.4% of all households were made up of individuals, and 22.5% had someone living alone who was 65 years of age or older. The average household size was 2.32 and the average family size was 3.06.

In the city, the population was spread out, with 26.6% under the age of 18, 7.5% from 18 to 24, 21.9% from 25 to 44, 20.1% from 45 to 64, and 23.9% who were 65 years of age or older. The median age was 39 years. For every 100 females, there were 86.3 males. For every 100 females age 18 and over, there were 77.8 males.

The median income for a household in the city was $21,750, and the median income for a family was $34,375. Males had a median income of $26,458 versus $16,167 for females. The per capita income for the city was $13,962. About 16.2% of families and 21.0% of the population were below the poverty line, including 26.1% of those under age 18 and 28.5% of those age 65 or over.

Education
The community is served by Clifton-Clyde USD 224 public school district, which has three schools:
 Clifton-Clyde Senior High School, located in Clyde.
 Clifton-Clyde Middle School, located in Clifton.
 Clifton-Clyde Grade School, located in Clifton.

The Clifton-Clyde High School mascot is Eagles. Prior to school unification in 1981, the Clifton High School mascot was Cardinals.

The Clifton Cardinals won the Kansas State High School class 1A Football championship in 1969.

Notable people

 William Henderson, painter, architect, and furniture designer.
 Robert McAlmon, author, poet, and publisher.

See also
 Central Branch Union Pacific Railroad

Notes

References

Further reading

External links
 Clifton - Directory of Public Officials
 Clifton city map, KDOT

Cities in Kansas
Cities in Clay County, Kansas
Cities in Washington County, Kansas